Hiroshi Futami (二見 宏志, born 20 March 1992) is a Japanese football defender who currently plays for V-Varen Nagasaki in the J2 League.

Club statistics
Updated to 18 February 2019.

References

External links

Profile at Vegalta Sendai
Profile at Shimizu S-Pulse

1992 births
Living people
Hannan University alumni
Association football people from Nara Prefecture
Japanese footballers
J1 League players
J2 League players
Vegalta Sendai players
Shimizu S-Pulse players
V-Varen Nagasaki players
Association football defenders
Universiade bronze medalists for Japan
Universiade medalists in football
Medalists at the 2013 Summer Universiade